Motzfeldt is a Scandinavian surname. Notable people with the surname include:

Angu Motzfeldt, Greenlandic singer
Benny Motzfeldt (1909–1995), Norwegian artist
Birger Fredrik Motzfeldt (1898–1987), Norwegian aviator and military officer
Carl Frederik Motzfeldt (1808–1902), Norwegian politician
Ernst Motzfeldt (1842–1915), Norwegian politician
Frederik Motzfeldt (1779–1848), Norwegian politician
Jonathan Motzfeldt (1938–2010), Greenlandic politician
Josef Motzfeldt (born 1941), Greenlandic politician
Ketil Motzfeldt (1814–1889), Norwegian naval officer and politician
Nukaaka Coster-Waldau née Motzfeldt, Greenlandic singer, actress, and former model
Peter Motzfeldt (1777–1854), Norwegian military officer and politician
Ulrik Anton Motzfeldt (1807–1865), Norwegian jurist and politician